Andy Price is an American comic artist, currently employed by IDW Publishing. He illustrates the My Little Pony: Friendship is Magic comic.

Career
Price acted as the artist (along with writer Katie Cook) behind issues #1-4 of My Little Pony: Friendship is Magic, a comic based on the popular children's TV show of the same name. Price and Cook also created the one-shot My Little Pony: Micro Series issue centered on Rarity, the unicorn, and Price wrote and drew the final installment of the My Little Pony: Friends Forever series.

Price has done illustration work for DC Comics, Marvel Comics, Innovation Comics, and the Rittenhouse Archives. His other comics work includes licensed titles based on the television series Quantum Leap and WordGirl.

Price is a graduate of Austin High School in Decatur, Alabama, and the Joe Kubert School of Cartoon and Graphic Art. He currently resides in Madison, Alabama, with his wife, Alice.

References

External links 

Official website

Living people
American comics artists
People from Madison, Alabama
People from Decatur, Alabama
Year of birth missing (living people)
DC Comics people
Marvel Comics people